Menna Shaaban Okila (born 25 May 2000) is an Egyptian karateka. She won the silver medal in the women's +68 kg event at the 2021 World Karate Championships held in Dubai, United Arab Emirates. She also won the gold medal in the women's team kumite event.

Career 

She won one of the bronze medals in her event at the 2019 African Karate Championships held in Gaborone, Botswana. She represented Egypt at the African Games held in Rabat, Morocco and she won the silver medal in the women's kumite +68 kg event.

In October 2021, she won the gold medal in her event at the 2021 Mediterranean Karate Championships held in Limassol, Cyprus. In December 2021, she won one of the bronze medals in her event at the 2021 African Karate Championships held in Cairo, Egypt. She also won the gold medal in the women's team kumite event.

She competed in the women's +68 kg event at the 2022 Mediterranean Games held in Oran, Algeria. She lost her first match against eventual silver medalist Milena Jovanović of Montenegro and she was then eliminated in the repechage by María Torres of Spain.

She competed in the women's kumite +68 kg event at the 2022 World Games held in Birmingham, United States. She lost each of her matches in the elimination round and she did not advance to the semi-finals.

Achievements

References 

Living people
2000 births
Place of birth missing (living people)
Egyptian female karateka
African Games medalists in karate
African Games silver medalists for Egypt
Competitors at the 2019 African Games
Competitors at the 2022 Mediterranean Games
Mediterranean Games competitors for Egypt
Competitors at the 2022 World Games
21st-century Egyptian women